Ropica dissonans is a species of beetle in the family Cerambycidae. It was described by Gahan in 1907.

References

dissonans
Beetles described in 1907